Sir George Osborne Morgan, 1st Baronet,  (8 May 1826 – 25 August 1897) was a Welsh lawyer and Liberal politician.

Life
Born at Gothenburg, Sweden, Morgan was educated at Friars School, Bangor, Shrewsbury School and Balliol College, Oxford, and was a scholar of Worcester College, Oxford, from 1847.

Morgan became a barrister of Lincoln's Inn in 1853. He was Liberal MP for Denbighshire from 1868 to 1885, and for Denbighshire East from 1885 until his death. He introduced Burials Bill in 1870 re-introducing it for ten successive sessions until it was finally passed in 1880, allowing any Christian ritual in a parish cemetery, and the Places of Worship (Sites) Bill, which became law in 1873. He was appointed a Queen's Counsel and a bencher of Lincoln's Inn in 1869, serving as treasurer from 1890. He was chairman of the House of Commons Select Committee on Land Titles and Transfer from 1878–9. Among his many Welsh involvements was support for the Welsh Sunday closing bill, disestablishment of the Welsh Church, supporting the University College of Wales at Aberystwyth.

He held office as Judge Advocate General under William Gladstone from 1880 to 1885, and was appointed a privy councillor in 1880. He introduced successfully the annual Army Discipline Bill in 1881, and took charge of Married Women's Property Bill, 1882. He was re-elected as Member of Parliament for East Denbighshire in 1885, 1886, and 1892, defeating Sir Watkin Williams-Wynn, whose family had represented Denbighshire in Parliament for 177 years.

He once again held office under Gladstone as Under-Secretary of State for the Colonies in 1886.

He was created a Baronet, of Green Street, Grosvenor Square, in the Parish of Saint George, Hanover Square, in the County of London and of Lincoln's Inn, in 1892. The baronetcy became extinct on his death, since he had no children by his wife Emily (née Reiss).

Works
Morgan published a translation of Virgil's Eclogues in English hexameters, and other writings.

References

George Osborne Morgan in  Welsh Biography Online

External links
 

1826 births
1897 deaths
Members of the Privy Council of the United Kingdom
People educated at Friars School, Bangor
People educated at Shrewsbury School
Baronets in the Baronetage of the United Kingdom
Liberal Party (UK) MPs for Welsh constituencies
19th-century King's Counsel
UK MPs 1868–1874
UK MPs 1874–1880
UK MPs 1880–1885
UK MPs 1885–1886
UK MPs 1886–1892
UK MPs 1892–1895
UK MPs 1895–1900